Srugim, is an Israeli television drama which originally aired on Yes TV between 2008 and 2012. It was directed by Laizy Shapiro, who co-created it with Hava Divon.

 In early May 2012, though the last season was considered the most successful so far, Shapiro and Divon announced they would not produce a fourth one, and the show was terminated.

In February 2010, the series began to air on The Jewish Channel in the United States. 

As of 2017, all of the series is available on Amazon Prime.

Series overview

Episodes

Season 1 (2008)

Season 2 (2010)

Season 3 (2011–12)

References

Lists of Israeli television series episodes